Abbott–Page House is a historic house located on Mason Road, 2.5 miles northeast of Milan, Ohio. It is locally significant as an early, still surviving farm, and as a well-preserved example of Federal/Greek Revival architecture.

Description and history 
The -story house has a gabled roof and a modified T-shaped layout. It has historically been used as a single dwelling, and is now owned by two families. It was listed on the National Register of Historic Places on May 27, 1975.

References 

Houses in Erie County, Ohio
National Register of Historic Places in Erie County, Ohio
Houses on the National Register of Historic Places in Ohio
Houses completed in 1824
Greek Revival houses in Ohio
Federal architecture in Ohio